Oliver Clifton (1847 - January 2, 1905) was a member of the Mississippi House of Representatives and three-time mayor of Jackson, Mississippi.

Biography 
Oliver Clifton was born in 1847 in Jackson, Mississippi. He first became the mayor of Jackson from 1870 to 1871. He then served in the Mississippi House of Representatives from his election in 1875 to 1878, representing Hinds County. He married Marion Yerger in 1877. He was appointed Clerk of the Mississippi Supreme Court in 1878, a position in which he served until 1894. He then was the mayor from 1895 to 1897. He was elected for a third term in 1904, but died of pneumonia on January 2, 1905, immediately before or after his installation.

References 

1847 births
1905 deaths
Mayors of Jackson, Mississippi
People from Jackson, Mississippi